Dustin Hersee (born August 14, 1975) is a former backstroke swimmer from Canada, who competed at the 2000 Summer Olympics in Sydney, Australia.  There he ended up in 20th place in the men's 200-metre backstroke event, clocking 2:01.34 in the preliminary heats.

He worked at St. George's Senior School Vancouver coaching the competitive, learning, and provincial groups there, until he left in 2015. Hersee started in 2001 as the full-time physical education teacher and aquatics director at St. George's School.  As head of aquatics, He and his coaching staff have led the St. George's Swim team to 12 consecutive provincial championships, and also coaches the snowboard team. Hersee enjoys yoga, surfing, biking, and ocean swimming in his spare time.

References
 sports-reference

1975 births
Living people
Canadian male backstroke swimmers
Olympic swimmers of Canada
Swimmers from Vancouver
Swimmers at the 1999 Pan American Games
Swimmers at the 2000 Summer Olympics
UBC Thunderbirds swimmers
Pan American Games competitors for Canada